Robert S. Lucas (July 6, 1930 – July 10, 2016) was a rear admiral in the United States Coast Guard.

Biography
Lucas was born on July 6, 1930 in Hutchinson, Kansas. He graduated from Gresham High School in Gresham, Oregon before graduating from the Massachusetts Institute of Technology.

Career
Lucas graduated from the United States Coast Guard Academy in 1952.

From 1960 to 1962, Lucas served aboard . He returned to Wachusett to serve as executive officer. In 1967, Lucas assumed command of the cutter. During this time, Wachusett was deployed to serve in the Vietnam War, with Coast Guard Squadron Three as a part of Operation Market Time.

Afterwards, Lucas was stationed in New Orleans, Louisiana. In 1980, he assumed command of the United States Coast Guard Yard. Afterwards, Lucas became chief of the Office of Engineering of the Coast Guard.

Awards he received during his career include the Navy Presidential Unit Citation, the Coast Guard Unit Commendation, the Bronze Star Medal, the Legion of Merit, the Meritorious Service Medal, the Coast Guard Commendation Medal, the National Defense Service Medal, the Coast Guard Arctic Service Medal, the Vietnam Service Medal, the Vietnamese Gallantry Cross and the Vietnam Campaign Medal.

References

1930 births
2016 deaths
People from Hutchinson, Kansas
People from Gresham, Oregon
United States Coast Guard admirals
Recipients of the Legion of Merit
Recipients of the Gallantry Cross (Vietnam)
United States Coast Guard personnel of the Vietnam War
United States Coast Guard Academy alumni
Massachusetts Institute of Technology alumni
Gresham High School (Oregon) alumni
Military personnel from Oregon